Vyacheslav Yemelyanovich Dryagin ; September 20, 1940 in Kirov,Kirov Oblast – February 22, 2002) was a Soviet Nordic combined skier who competed in the early 1960s and the early 1970s. He won a bronze medal in the individual event at the 1970 FIS Nordic World Ski Championships in Vysoké Tatry. Dryagin finished seventh in the individual event at the 1964 Winter Olympics in Innsbruck. He also finished eighth in the individual event at the 1968 Winter Olympics in Grenoble.

External links

Mention of Vyacheslav Dryagin's death 

1940 births
2002 deaths
Nordic combined skiers at the 1964 Winter Olympics
Nordic combined skiers at the 1968 Winter Olympics
Nordic combined skiers at the 1972 Winter Olympics
Olympic Nordic combined skiers of the Soviet Union
Soviet male Nordic combined skiers
FIS Nordic World Ski Championships medalists in Nordic combined
Universiade medalists in nordic combined
Universiade gold medalists for the Soviet Union
Universiade silver medalists for the Soviet Union
Competitors at the 1962 Winter Universiade
Competitors at the 1964 Winter Universiade
Competitors at the 1966 Winter Universiade
Sportspeople from Kirov, Kirov Oblast